General Sir Cecil James East  (10 July 1837 – 14 March 1908) was a British Army officer who became Governor and Commandant of the Royal Military College Sandhurst.

Military career
East was commissioned as an ensign in the 82nd Regiment of Foot in 1854 and fought in the Crimean War. 
He also served in the Indian Mutiny and was wounded at Cawnpore. He transferred to the 41st Regiment of Foot and served as Assistant Quartermaster-General on the Lushai expedition in 1871 before being appointed Deputy Adjutant and Quartermaster-General during the Anglo-Zulu War of 1879 and then becoming Commander of the 1st Division during the Third Anglo-Burmese War in 1885. He went on to command several districts in India and became Governor and Commandant of the Royal Military College Sandhurst from 1893 to 1898. He was promoted to general on 27 August 1902.

In retirement he lived in Fairhaven near Winchester. He is buried at Kings Worthy in Hampshire. He is author of a book entitled The Armed Strength of France.

Family
In 1863 he married Jane Catharine Smith; they had a son and a daughter, Charles Conran East and Kate Florence East. Then in 1875 he married Frances Elizabeth Mogg; they had one daughter.

References

Sources

 

1837 births
1908 deaths
British Army generals
Knights Commander of the Order of the Bath
Commandants of Sandhurst
South Lancashire Regiment officers
British Army personnel of the Crimean War
British military personnel of the Indian Rebellion of 1857
41st Regiment of Foot officers
British Army personnel of the Anglo-Zulu War
British military personnel of the Third Anglo-Burmese War
British military personnel of the Lushai Expedition